The concept of a Volkstaat ("People's State"), also called a Boerestaat, is a proposed view to establish an all-White Afrikaner homeland within the borders of South Africa, most commonly proposed as a fully independent Boer/Afrikaner nation. The concept excludes Afrikaans-speaking Coloureds but accepts South Africans of English ancestry and other White South Africans, if they accept Afrikaner culture and customs. 

Following the Great Trek of the 1830s and 1840s, Boer pioneers expressed a drive for self-determination and independence through the establishment of several Boer republics over the rest of the 19th century.  The end of apartheid and the establishment of universal suffrage in South Africa in 1994 left some Afrikaners feeling disillusioned and marginalised by the political changes, which resulted in a proposal for an independent Volkstaat.

Several different methods have been proposed for the establishment of a Volkstaat. Besides the use of force, the South African Constitution, and international law present certain possibilities for their establishment. The geographic dispersal of minority Afrikaner communities throughout South Africa presents a significant obstacle to the establishment of a Volkstaat, because Afrikaners do not form a majority in any separate geographic area that could be sustainable independently. Supporters of the proposal have established several land cooperatives in Orania in the Northern Cape province and Kleinfontein in Gauteng as practical implementations of the idea. Initiatives in Balmoral and Morgenzon, both in Mpumalanga, failed to develop beyond their initial phase.

History

Historically, Boers have exhibited a drive for independence which resulted in the establishment of different republics in what is now the modern Republic of South Africa. The Voortrekkers proclaimed separate independent republics, most notably Natalia Republic, the Orange Free State and the South African Republic (the Transvaal). However, after the Second Anglo-Boer War (1899-1902), British rule led to the dissolution of the last two remaining Boer states (the Orange Free State and the South African Republic).

Under apartheid, the South African government promoted Afrikaner culture; though both Afrikaans and English were the official languages, the majority of the politicians running the country were Afrikaners. The underlying principle of apartheid was racial separatism, and the means by which this was implemented, such as the homeland system of bantustans, were biased against the non-European majority as they excluded them from exercising their rights in the broader South Africa.

In the 1980s, a group of Afrikaners, led by HF Verwoerd's son-in-law, formed a group called the Oranjewerkers. They also planned a community based on "Afrikaner self-determination", and attempted to create a neo-"boerstaat" (literally: "Boer State," a reference to an idiomatic term for an Afrikaner-only state) in the remote Eastern Transvaal (now Mpumalanga) community of Morgenzon.

In 1988, Professor Carel Boshoff (1927-2011) founded the Afrikaner-Vryheidstigting (Afrikaner Freedom Foundation), or Avstig. Avstig proposed a Volkstaat in the Northern Cape province, in a largely rural and minimally developed region. Avstig bought the town of Orania in 1991, and turned it into a model Volkstaat. Boshoff continued to be a representative of the Freedom Front, a political party advocating the Volkstaat concept. Orania lies at the far eastern apex of the original Volkstaat state, near where the boundaries of the three provinces Northern Cape, Eastern Cape, and Free State meet.

Support and opposition

Freedom Front in the 1994 general election
During the 1994 general election, Afrikaners were asked by the Freedom Front (FF) to vote for the party if they wished to form an independent state or Volkstaat for Afrikaners.  The results of the election showed that the Freedom Front had the support of 424,555 voters, the fourth highest in the country. The FF did not however gain a majority in any of South Africa's voting districts, their closest being 4,692 votes in Phalaborwa, representing 30.38% of that district.

Public opinion surveys of white South Africans
Two surveys were conducted among white South Africans, in 1993 and 1996, asking the question "How do you feel about demarcating an area for Afrikaners and other "European" South Africans in which they may enjoy self determination? Do you support the idea of a Volkstaat?" The 1993 survey found that 29% supported the idea, and a further 18% would consider moving to a Volkstaat. The 1996 survey found that this had decreased to 22% supporting the idea, and only 9% wanting to move to a Volkstaat. In the second survey, the proportion of white South Africans opposed to the idea had increased from 34% to 66%.

The 1996 survey found that "those who in 1996 said that they would consider moving to a Volkstaat are mainly Afrikaans speaking males, who are supporters of the Conservative Party or Afrikaner Freedom Front, hold racist views (24%; slightly racist: 6%, non racist: 0%), call themselves Afrikaners and are not content with the new democratic South Africa." The study used the Duckitt scale of subtle racism to measure racist views.

A 1999 pre-election survey suggested that the 26.9% of Afrikaners wanting to emigrate, but unable to, represented a desire for a solution such as a Volkstaat.

In January 2010, Beeld, an Afrikaans newspaper, held an online survey. Out of 11,019 respondents, 56% (6,178) said that they would move to a Volkstaat if one were created, a further 17% (1,908) would consider it while only 27% (2,933) would not consider it as a viable option. The newspaper's analysis of this was that the idea of a Volkstaat was doodgebore (stillborn) and that its advocates had been doing nothing but tread water for the past two decades, although it did suggest that the poll was a measure of dissatisfaction among Afrikaners. Hermann Giliomee later cited the Beeld poll in saying that over half of "northern Afrikaners" would prefer to live in a homeland.

Borders

Penuell Maduna, one of the leading ANC negotiators during the transition era, noted that Afrikaner organizations could not agree on the borders of the new Volkstaat.

The Conservative Party wanted a boerestaat in one part of the country, the Afrikaner Volksunie in another, and Carel Boshoff in Orania. The proposal to create a state out of the white neighborhoods of Pretoria, which would then stretch to the Atlantic Ocean, was also seen as unacceptable by the ANC.

Issues creating support

Dissatisfaction with life in post-apartheid South Africa is often cited as an indication of support for the idea of a Volkstaat among Afrikaners. A poll carried out by the Volkstaat Council among white people in Pretoria identified crime, economic problems, personal security, affirmative action, educational standards, population growth, health services, language and cultural rights, and housing as reasons to support the creation of Volkstaat.

Crime

Crime has remained a major problem in South Africa since the end of Apartheid. According to a survey for the period 1998–2000 compiled by the United Nations, South Africa was ranked second for assault and murder (by all means) per capita. Total crime per capita is 10th out of the 60 countries in the data set. Crime has had a pronounced effect on society: many wealthier South Africans moved into gated communities, abandoning the central business districts of some cities for the relative security of suburbs.

Farm attacks

Among rural Afrikaners, violent crime committed against the white farming community has contributed significantly to a hardening of attitudes. Between 1998 and 2001 there were some 3,500 recorded farm attacks in South Africa, resulting in the murder of 541 farmers, their families or their workers, during only three years. On average more than two farm attack related murders are committed every week.

The Freedom Front interprets this as racial violence targeting Afrikaners: In mid-2001 the Freedom Front appealed to the United Nations Human Rights Commission to place pressure on the South African government to do something about the murder of white South African farmers, which "had taken on the shape of an ethnic massacre". Freedom Front leader Pieter Mulder claimed that most farm attacks seemed orchestrated, and that the motive for the attacks was not only criminal; Mulder further claimed that "a definite anti-Boer climate had taken root in South Africa. People accused of murdering Boers and Afrikaners were often applauded by supporters during court appearances".

The independent Committee of Inquiry into Farm Attacks, appointed by the National Commissioner of Police, published a report in 2003, however, indicating that European people were not targeted exclusively, that theft occurred in most attacks, and that the proportion of European victims had decreased in the four years preceding the report.

The number of farm attacks is disputed. In 2010, several international news publications reported that over 3,000 white farmers had been murdered since 1994. However, the Afrikaner farmers' group Transvaal Agricultural Union stated that 1,544 people were killed in farm attacks from 1990 to 2012 Between 1994 and 2019 approximately 500,000 people were murdered in total in South Africa.

Genocide Watch has theorised that farm attacks constitute early warning signs of genocide against white South Africans and it has criticised the South African government for its inaction on the issue, pointing out that the murder rate for them ("ethno-European farmers" in their report, which also included non-Afrikaner farmers of European race) is four times that of the general South African population. However, the South African government and other analysts dispute these figures, saying white South African farmers are not killed at a disproportionate rate. South African government data indicated between 54 and 74 murders on farms annually in the period 2015–2019, and 48-64 during 2010–2014; out of about 20,000 murders per year in South Africa. More black South Africans are killed than white South Africans in farm attacks, though white South Africans still make up a disproportionate number of those murdered on farms due to rural areas being more white. The motive for the attacks is disputed. Johan Burger of the Institute for Security Studies (ISS) has said that attacks were motivated not by race but by greed. 

In January 2015, AfriForum reported that there has been an increase in farm attacks and murders in the previous five years.

According to AfriForum deputy CEO Ernst Roets: "It is important to note that not all who are murdered on farms are white people. On the other hand, it is equally important to note that black farmers are not subjected to the same levels of torture as their white counterparts". Based on this, some consider more suitable to say "farm terror" and "farm torture" to refer to what is happening to white South African farmers since the end of Apartheid regime.

A spike in violent attacks on farmers in February 2017, led to one of the country's largest prayer meetings being held on 22–23 April 2017 in Bloemfontein, attracting over 1,000,000 participants.

Rise in unemployment
Despite a deterioration of the situation since the end of apartheid, Afrikaners have one of the highest rates of employment, and of job satisfaction, in the country. White unemployment has experienced the greatest proportional increase between 1995 and 2001: 19.7% compared to a national average of 27%. In 2001 some 228,000 economically active whites were unemployed.

Job satisfaction among employed Afrikaners is second to that of English-speaking Whites, with a survey in 2001 showing that 78% of Afrikaner respondents were either "very satisfied", or "fairly satisfied", with their employment situation. This is worse than the situation under apartheid, when all whites were afforded preferential treatment in non-bantustans; hence, it is likely that those Afrikaners who are unemployed will tend to support initiatives such as the Volkstaat. In Wingard's words, "They will be easy meat for activists."

One in five white South Africans emigrated during the decade ending 2005 due to crime and Affirmative Action. Affirmative Action is implemented by South African legislation, according to which all business employees should reflect the total demographic make up of the country, placing significant difficulty on White-Africans to enter the job market.

Emigration
According to the 1999 pre-election survey, 2.5% of Afrikaner respondents were emigrating, 26.4% would leave if they could, and 5.3% were considering emigrating. The majority, 64.9%, were definitely staying. The survey suggested that the numerous Afrikaners wanting to emigrate, but unable to, represented a desire for a solution such as a Volkstaat.

A survey released by the South African Institute for Race Relations during September 2006, indicated that a decline in South Africa's white population was estimated at 16.1% for the decade ending 2005. However, it was found that this decline was largely due to emigration of white individuals from South Africa.

Reduced political representation
The Afrikaners, a minority group in South Africa, relinquished their dominance of the minority rule over South Africa during the 1994 democratic elections and now only play a small role in South African politics. Some Afrikaners, such as the members of the Volkstaat Council, felt that equal representation did not provide adequate protection for minorities, and desired self-rule. The Volkstaat was proposed as one means of achieving this.

Thabo Mbeki, then President of South Africa, quoted an Afrikaner leader with whom he had been engaged in negotiations, "One of our interlocutors expressed this in the following way that 'the Afrikaner is suffering from the hangover of loss of power' resulting in despondency."

Endangered cultural heritage
In 2002 a number of towns and cities with historic Afrikaans names dating back to Voortrekker times—such as Pietersburg and Potgietersrus—had their names changed, often in the face of popular opposition to the change. In the same year the government decided that state departments had to choose a single language for inter- and intra-departmental communication, effectively compelling public servants to communicate using English with one another.

Of the 31 universities in South Africa, five were historically Afrikaans (Free State,
Potchefstroom, Pretoria, Rand Afrikaans University and Stellenbosch). In mid-2002 the national Minister of Education, Kader Asmal, announced that Afrikaans medium universities must implement parallel teaching in English, despite a proposal by a government appointed commission that two Afrikaans universities should be retained to further Afrikaans as an academic language.  According to the government's language policy for higher education "the notion of Afrikaans universities runs counter to the end goal of a transformed higher education system".

Movements for the Volkstaat
The Freedom Front has been the major political driving force for the formation of a Volkstaat. This Afrikaner-focused political party has representation in the national Parliament as well as several Provincial legislatures in South Africa. Support for this party has however decreased to just under 140,000 votes, being less than 1% of the total votes cast (approximately 20% among registered Afrikaner voters) by the 2004 national elections. The Freedom Front advocates following the Belgium, Canada and Spain models of granting territorial autonomy to linguistic minorities, believing it the only way to protect the rights of Afrikaner people. Under this policy, it proposes the creation of an Afrikaner homeland, comprising the area that lies in the North Western Cape between the West Coast and the Orange River.

The Afrikaner Weerstandsbeweging made headlines in March 2008 for their re-activation and plans of establishing an independent Boer state. Plans include a demand for land, such as Stellaland and Goshen, that they claim is legally theirs in terms of the Sand River Convention of 1852 and other historical treaties, through the International Court of Justice in The Hague if necessary.

Die Boeremag (The Farmer-Might) was a violent Boer separatist organisation. Most of its members were arrested in 2003, and are facing charges of treason. Similar violent methods towards Volkstaat were employed by the Orde van die Dood in the 1980s.

The Front National has called for the re-establishment of Stellaland as possible Volkstaat.

Orania 

One Volkstaat attempt is the small town of Orania in the Northern Cape province. The land on which Orania is built is privately owned, and Afrikaners have been encouraged by promoters of the Volkstaat concept to move to Orania, although only a small number has responded, resulting in a population of 519 in 2001, 10 years after being established. Support for Orania recently seems to be growing somewhat with their recent economic "boom". Today, Orania is home to about 3,000 Afrikaners but has approximately 7,000 'uitwoners' or 'outhabitants' who are part of the Orania Movement. Orania is currently petitioning the government to become a separate municipality and in the meantime their (transitional) representative council will remain in place indefinitely with all its powers, rights and duties.

Kleinfontein 
Another attempt is the settlement of Kleinfontein outside Pretoria (in the Tshwane metropolitan area). Kleinfontein falls within the metropolitan area of Tshwane. In 2013 Tshwane recognized Kleinfontein as cultural community.  Members of the African National Congress and Democratic Alliance have denounced the settlement and the continued existence of whites only settlements in post-apartheid South Africa.

Legal basis
Section 235 of the South African Constitution allows for the right to self-determination of a community, within the framework of "the right of the South African people as a whole to self-determination", and pursuant to national legislation. This section of the constitution was one of the negotiated settlements during the handing over of political power in 1994. The Freedom Front was instrumental in including this section in the constitution. No national legislation in this regard has yet been enacted for any ethnic group, however.

International law presents a recourse for the establishment of a Volkstaat over and above than what the South African Constitution offers. Thus is available to all minorities who wish to obtain self-determination in the form of independence. The requirements set by international law are explained by Prof C. Lloyd Brown-John of the University of Windsor (Canada), as follows: "A minority who are geographically separate and who are distinct ethnically and culturally and who have been placed in a position of subordination may have a right to secede.  That right, however, could only be exercised if there is a clear denial of political, linguistic, cultural and religious rights." The rights awarded to minorities were formally asserted by the United Nations General Assembly when it adopted resolution 47/135 on 18 December 1992. However, it is questionable whether this applies to Afrikaners, as there is no municipality in South Africa in which white, Afrikaans-speaking citizens represent a majority,.

Governmental response
On 5 June 1998, Mohammed Valli Moosa (then minister of constitutional development in the African National Congress (ANC) government) stated during a parliamentary budget debate that "the ideal of some Afrikaners to develop the North Western Cape as a home for the Afrikaner culture and language within the framework of the Constitution and the charter of human rights is viewed by the government as a legitimate ideal."

On 23 July 2014, members of an Afrikaner group who call themselves the "Boer-Afrikaner Volksraad" announced forthcoming talks with the South African government around the concept of territorial self-determination for "Boer Afrikaner people". The talks would include either President Jacob Zuma, his deputy Cyril Ramaphosa, or both; and would be held before the end of August 2014.

See also 
Volkstaat Council
Afrikaner nationalism
Cape Party
Unrepresented Nations and Peoples Organization
Sovereign State of Good Hope
Self-determination
Conservative Party (South Africa)
National Conservative Party of South Africa
Etat Pied-Noir
White ethnostate

References

External links
Vryheidsfront/Freedom Front Plus Political Party
Orania website
Kleinfontein website

Separatism in South Africa
Afrikaner nationalism
Boer nationalism
Political terminology in South Africa
White separatism
Proposed countries